Guitar and Drum is the ninth studio album recorded by Stiff Little Fingers, released in 2003.

Track listing 
"Guitar & Drum" (Burns) – 3:11
"Strummerville" (Burns) – 3:19
"Can't Get Away With That" (McCallum) – 3:16
"Still Burning" (Burns, Foxton, Grantley) – 3:18
"Walkin' Dynamite" (Burns) – 3:51
"Dead Man Walking" (Burns) – 3:34
"Empty Sky" (Foxton, Grantley) – 2:36
"Be True to Yourself" (McCallum) – 3:38
"Best of Fools" (Burns) – 2:15
"I Waited" (Grantley) – 3:10
"Achilles' Heart" (Burns) – 3:04
"Who Died and Made You Elvis?" (Burns) – 3:37
"High & Low" (Burns) – 2:13
"Protect and Serve" (Burns) – 4:03

2009 Deluxe Edition bonus tracks
 "Tinderbox" (Live) – 4:05
 "Strummerville" (Live) – 4:19
 "Can't Get Away with That" (Live) – 3:35
 "Guitar and Drum" (Live) – 3:19
 "Bits of Kids" (Live) – 3:56

Personnel
 Jake Burns – Vocals, guitar
 Ian McCallum – guitar, Vocals
 Bruce Foxton – bass guitar, Vocals
 Steve Grantley – drums, Vocals

References

2003 albums
Stiff Little Fingers albums